Glucose-6-phosphate exchanger SLC37A1 is a protein that in humans is encoded by the SLC37A1 gene. SLC37A1 locates to the membrane of the endoplasmic reticulum (ER), and is a glucose 6-phosphate:inorganic phosphate antiporter, transporting glucose 6-phosphate from the cytoplasm into the lumen of the ER, while transporting phosphate in the opposite direction.

Unlike the related SLC37A4 protein, SLC37A1 does not appear to be involved in blood glucose homeostasis, but does appear to regulate phosphate levels in the milk of cows, with flow-on effects on the volume of milk produced.

References

Further reading 

 

Solute carrier family